Tino Schmidt (born 2 October 1993) is a German footballer who plays as a right midfielder for SV Babelsberg 03. He came through Carl Zeiss Jena's youth system and made his debut in January 2012, as a substitute for Jan Simak in a 3. Liga match against 1. FC Saarbrücken.

External links

Living people
1993 births
Association football midfielders
German footballers
FC Carl Zeiss Jena players
1. FC Kaiserslautern players
SV Babelsberg 03 players
Sportfreunde Lotte players
3. Liga players
2. Bundesliga players
Regionalliga players
People from Nordhausen, Thuringia
Footballers from Thuringia